"Sleeping My Day Away" is the most successful single from the Danish rock band D-A-D outside Denmark, with two weeks on the UK top 100. The single was released in 1989, with "Ill Will" as the b-side. Both songs appear on their No Fuel Left for the Pilgrims album.

The song was covered by German gothic rock band Mono Inc. for their album Pain, Love & Poetry.

Music video

The official music video for the song was directed by Andy Morahan, and takes place primarily in a bedroom. The music video received heavy airplay on MTV.

Track listing
 "Sleeping My Day Away"
 "Ill Will"

Charts

References

External links
 Single info

1989 singles
1989 songs
D.A.D. (band) songs
English-language Danish songs
Music videos directed by Andy Morahan
Warner Music Group singles